The 2023 Manchester City Council elections are scheduled to take place on 4 May 2023 alongside other local elections across the United Kingdom. One third of councillors (32) on Manchester City Council are to be elected.

Background

History 
The Local Government Act 1972 created a two-tier system of metropolitan counties and districts covering Greater Manchester, Merseyside, South Yorkshire, Tyne and Wear, the West Midlands, and West Yorkshire starting in 1974. Manchester was a district of the Greater Manchester metropolitan county. The Local Government Act 1985 abolished the metropolitan counties, with metropolitan districts taking on most of their powers as metropolitan boroughs. The Greater Manchester Combined Authority was created in 2011 and began electing the mayor of Greater Manchester from 2017, which was given strategic powers covering a region coterminous with the former Greater Manchester metropolitan county.

Since its formation, Manchester City Council has continuously been under Labour control. In the most recent council election in 2022, Labour won 30 of the 32 seats up for election with 65.4% of the vote, with the Liberal Democrats and the Green Party each winning one seat with 12.7% and 11.4% of the vote across the borough respectively. The Conservatives received 8.8% of the vote but did not win any seats.

Candidates up for re-election in 2023 are those who were elected in 2019.

Council term 
Since the 2022 Manchester City Council election councillor Ekua Bayunu, who was elected as a Labour Party candidate in Hulme in 2021, quit the Labour party and joined the Green party.

Electoral process 
The council elects its councillors in thirds, with a third being up for election every year for three years, with no election in the fourth year. Councillors are elected via first-past-the-post voting, with each ward represented by three councillors, with one elected in each election year to serve a four-year term.

All registered electors (British, Irish, Commonwealth and European Union citizens) living in Manchester aged 18 or over will be entitled to vote in the election. People who live at two addresses in different councils, such as university students with different term-time and holiday addresses, are entitled to be registered for and vote in elections in both local authorities. Voting in-person at polling stations will take place from 07:00 to 22:00 on election day, and voters will be able to apply for postal votes or proxy votes in advance of the election.

Council composition
After the 2022 election, the composition of the council was:

Heading in to the election, the composition of the council is:

Candidates 

Asterisks denote incumbent councillors seeking re-election. Unless otherwise noted, the councillors seeking re-election were elected in 2019.

Ancoats and Beswick

Ardwick

Baguley

Brooklands

Burnage

Charlestown

Cheetham

Chorlton

Chorlton Park

Clayton and Openshaw

Crumpsall

Deansgate

Didsbury East

Didsbury West

Fallowfield

Gorton and Abbey Hey

Harpurhey

Higher Blackley

Hulme

Levenshulme

Longsight

Miles Platting and Newton Heath

Moss Side

Moston

Northenden

Old Moat

Piccadilly

Rusholme

Sharston

Whalley Range

Withington

Woodhouse Park

References

Manchester City Council elections
Manchester
2020s in Manchester